Broadway–Dunklin Historic District is a national historic district located in Jefferson City, Cole County, Missouri.  It encompasses 23 contributing buildings in a predominantly residential section of Jefferson City. The district developed between about 1885 and 1915, and includes representative examples of Classical Revival, Late Victorian, and Colonial Revival style architecture. Notable buildings include the former Broadway School (1904).

It was listed on the National Register of Historic Places in 2002.

References

Historic districts on the National Register of Historic Places in Missouri
Neoclassical architecture in Missouri
Victorian architecture in Missouri
Colonial Revival architecture in Missouri
Buildings and structures in Cole County, Missouri
Buildings and structures in Jefferson City, Missouri
National Register of Historic Places in Cole County, Missouri